Nando's is a South African multinational fast casual chain that specialises in Portuguese flame-grilled peri-peri style chicken. Founded in Johannesburg in 1987, Nando's operates over 1,200 outlets in 30 countries. Their logo (also seen as a sort of mascot) depicts the Rooster of Barcelos, one of Portugal's most common symbols.

History

The restaurant was founded in 1987 in Rosettenville, Johannesburg by Portuguese-born Fernando Duarte and South African-born Robert Brozin. Upon visiting a Portuguese-Mozambican takeaway named Chickenland and trying the chicken with peri peri, they bought the restaurant for about 80,000 rand (equivalent to about £25,000 at the time). They renamed the restaurant Nando's after Fernando's firstborn son. By 1989, the restaurant had three outlets in Johannesburg and one in Portugal. Capricorn Ventures International acquired the chain in 1992. In 1996 a former Nando's franchisee founded the Portuguese-Mozambican style grilled-chicken restaurant Galito's which competes with Nando's in multiple markets.

In 2010, Advertising Age magazine named Nando's one of the world's top 30 hottest marketing brands alongside Tata Nano, MTN and Natura. During the same year, the success of Nando's in the U.K. led The Guardian to write that Nando's was a modern restaurant brand that had “changed the face of British fast food.” Nando's 1,000th store worldwide opened in 2012. As of July 2014, the Nando's restaurant group was ultimately owned by South African businessman Dick Enthoven and his family, through the Luxembourg-domiciled company Yellowwoods. Enthoven's son Robby Enthoven, who took over running the restaurants in 1993, was responsible for expanding the Nando's chain in the United Kingdom.

In 2018, American-based recruitment website Indeed named Nando's as the UK's sixth best private sector employer based on millions of employee ratings and reviews.

Worldwide locations

Nando's has locations in five continents worldwide.

Africa

South Africa

Fernando Duarte and his friend Robert Brozin, the founders of the first Nando's, bought a restaurant previously called "Chickenland" and renamed it Nando's. They opened it in 1987. By 2018, there were 340 Nando's restaurants throughout its home market of South Africa.

Botswana
Nando's has been operating in Botswana since 1993. There are 19 restaurants in Botswana; 10 in Gaborone, 2 in Francistown and Palapye, and 1 each in Jwaneng, Maun,  Mahalapye, Kasane and Letlhakane.

Eswatini
There are 2 outlets in Eswatini; in Mbabane and Manzini (2022).

Mauritius
, there are 4 Nando's restaurant outlets within Mauritius; in Curepipe, Grand-Baie, Moka and Vacoas-Phoenix.

Zambia
Nando's began operating in Zambia in 2002. , Nando's has 6 restaurants in Zambia; 4 in Lusaka and 1 each in Ndola and Kitwe.

Zimbabwe
Nando's has been operating in Zimbabwe since 1995. , Nando's has 14 restaurants in Zimbabwe; 9 in Harare and 1 each in Bulawayo, Mutare, Gweru, Kwekwe and Victoria Falls.

Asia

Bahrain
, Nando's has 5 restaurants in Bahrain; 2 in Manama and 1 each in Amwaj Islands, Isa Town and Saar.

Bangladesh

India
Nando's has been established in India since 2010. , Nando's has 12 restaurants throughout the states and union territories of India; 4 in New Delhi, 3 in Bangalore, 2 in Gurgaon, and 1 each in Noida, Chandigarh and Dwarka (Delhi).

Malaysia
Nando's has been established in Malaysia since 1998. The chain is very popular in the country and Malaysia is Nando's third largest market after the United Kingdom and Australia. Nando's is well known for its effective advertising that celebrates or satirises contemporary local issues. , Nando's has 73 restaurants operating throughout the states and federal territories of Malaysia (with the exception of Perlis and Labuan); 27 in Selangor, 19 in Kuala Lumpur, 2 in Putrajaya, 5 in Penang, 4 in Johor, 3 in Malacca, 3 in Perak, 3 in Sarawak, 2 in Negeri Sembilan and 1 each in Kedah, Kelantan, Pahang, Terengganu and Sabah.

Pakistan
Nando's has been established in Pakistan since 2001.  , Nando's has 12 restaurants throughout Pakistan; 5 in Karachi, 4 in Lahore and 1 each in Islamabad, Faisalabad and Rawalpindi.

Qatar
In Qatar, Nando's has been established since 2001, with the first restaurant located on Salwa Road. , Nando's has 8 branches in Qatar, 7 of which are located in Doha while 1 is in Al Wakrah.

Saudi Arabia
In Saudi Arabia, Nando's opened its first restaurant within the country on 12 December 2016 in Riyadh, and opened its first branch in Jeddah on 8 December 2018. , Nando's has 9 branches in Saudi Arabia; 3 in Riyadh, 3 in Jeddah; and 1 each in Dhahran, Dammam and Khobar.

Singapore
In Singapore, Nando's opened its first restaurant on 9 May 2010; and  there are 6 outlets throughout the city of Singapore.

United Arab Emirates
Nando's opened its first restaurant within the United Arab Emirates in Dubai (along Sheikh Zayed Road) in 2002 and opened its first branch in Abu Dhabi in 2014. , Nando's has 19 branches in the UAE; 13 in Dubai, 3 in Abu Dhabi and 1 each in Sharjah, Al Ain and Ras Al Khaimah.

Europe

Ireland
Nando's was first established in Ireland in 2008. The company opened its flagship restaurant on St Andrew Street in the city centre of Dublin in November 2011, employing sixty staff members to manage a  space spread over two floors. , they have expanded to a total of 12 outlets in Ireland, with 9 in Dublin, 2 in Cork, and 1 in Newbridge.

United Kingdom

Nando's opened its first restaurants within the United Kingdom, in 1992, in the west London suburbs of Ealing and Earls Court, initially focusing on takeaway food. The UK arm, owned by the Enthoven family via a private equity company, struggled until chairman Dick Enthoven put his son Robert in control. The focus then moved from takeaways to a mixed service (counter ordering and table service) model. This decision was taken after Nando's partnered with Harrison, a world-renowned branding and design agency. They also advised Nando's to design each restaurant individually so no two restaurants were the same, a brand characteristic of the chain. Nando's expanded in the UK in 1993. The company now employs around 8,000 staff in the UK and as of 2013 had over 280 branches, with some sixty serving food conforming with Islamic dietary laws.

In 2010, Nando's UK won the Sunday Timess best place to work award in the big company category. Its sauces and marinades were also retailed in UK supermarkets.

Nando's claims to have the largest collection of South African art in the UK, with over 5,000 works displayed in restaurants; original artworks are commissioned by the company.

The United Kingdom is Nando's largest market.

In March 2020, all 400 UK restaurants closed temporarily due to nationwide lockdown rules introduced by the government to limit the spread of COVID-19. In late April 2020, Nando's reopened select locations for delivery and collection services, with many more locations opening throughout May. In early July 2020, the restaurant chain started reopening a few of its outlets for eat-in service.

In August 2021, Nando's UK was forced to temporarily close 45 of its 450 restaurants due to Brexit and Covid-related upheaval in the food industry causing a shortage of chicken. A Nando's spokesperson said: "The UK food industry has been experiencing disruption across its supply chain in recent weeks due to staff shortages and Covid isolations, and a number of our restaurants have been impacted." Nando's UK also told customers online that shortages were a result of staff "isolation periods" and suppliers "struggling to keep up with demand", along with staffing issues at its suppliers' factories as well as the shortage of HGV lorry drivers. Nando's UK also deployed its own staff to support some of its key suppliers onsite and "help get things moving again".

North America

Canada

Nando's has operated since 1994 in Canada. , there are 32 branches in Canada, with 4 in Alberta, 17 in British Columbia, and 11 in Ontario.

United States
Nando's opened its first restaurant location within the United States, at Washington, D.C. in 2008. After opening more outlets within the Washington metropolitan area, it expanded into the Chicago metropolitan area, opening its first outlet on 20 May 2015 within the metro area. , there are 43 restaurant outlets in the U.S. (only present within the Washington, Baltimore and Chicago metropolitan areas): 12 in Illinois, 6 in Washington, D.C., 15 in Maryland, and 10 in Virginia.

Oceania

Australia
Nando's has been in continuous operation within Australia since 1990, when the first restaurant opened in Tuart Hill in Western Australia. , there were 155 restaurants in Australia; 63 in Victoria, 36 in Western Australia, 30 in Queensland, 16 in New South Wales, four in South Australia, two in the Northern Territory, two in Tasmania and one in the Australian Capital Territory. Per city, there are 59 in Melbourne, 34 in Perth, 20 in Brisbane, 15 in Sydney, four each in Adelaide and the Gold Coast, three in Ipswich, two each in Hobart and Darwin and one each in Ballarat, Bunbury, Canberra, Geelong, Kalgoorlie, Newcastle, Rockhampton, Shepparton, the Sunshine Coast, Townsville and Traralgon.

Notably, there have been various public battles between the parent company and its Australian franchisees.

New Zealand
Nando's opened their first outlet in New Zealand, at Glenfield in 2000. , there are 23 Nando's outlets throughout New Zealand, located in the regions of Auckland, Bay of Plenty, Christchurch, Hamilton, Wellington, and Dunedin.

Controversies

Advertising

Australian refugee advertisement
In Australia, Nando's ran an advertising campaign based around the 2002 political controversy regarding the mandatory detention of refugees. The detainees had been waging a hunger strike campaign, even resorting to sewing their lips closed. Nando's adverts proclaimed that the strikers "decided to unsew their lips after hearing the news that with every Nando's quarter chicken combo, Nando's are giving away an extra quarter chicken free." Melbourne's Sphere Advertising said that the ad was designed to spark controversy, saying that they knew that "there's a section of our audience that's going to be uncomfortable... but we want to evoke a response."

Malema advertisement
During the South African national elections of 2009, Nando's made an advert lampooning African National Congress Youth League then president Julius Malema by using a puppet that resembled him. Malema's lawyers sued Nando's and the original advert was removed. However, an altered version was released, with the puppet's face pixelated and the voice altered. The puppet used in the advert was later sold at auction for 100,000 rand, which was donated to an educational charity.

"Last dictators" advertisement
In 2011, Nando's launched a "Last dictators" advert in South Africa. The 60-second commercial shows a sad Robert Mugabe dining alone at Christmas in a large mansion while he reminisces about "happier times" with former dictators, such as playing water tag with Muammar Gaddafi, making snow angels in the sand with Saddam Hussein, singing karaoke with Mao Zedong, pushing P. W. Botha on a swing set, and riding a Covenanter cruiser tank with Idi Amin in a similar fashion to Leonardo DiCaprio and Kate Winslet embracing each other from the film Titanic, while the music from "Those Were the Days" is played. Musekiwa Kumbula, holder of the Nando's franchise in Zimbabwe, said his group "strongly feels the advertisement is insensitive and in poor taste." The advert also offended Chipangano, a Zimbabwean youth militia loyal to Mugabe, who then demanded an apology from Nando's, threatened to boycott the South Africa-based chain, and demanded the advert be withdrawn or the restaurant face retribution. Nando's South Africa subsequently withdrew the advert citing threats to its staff in Zimbabwe from a youth group.

Corporation tax bill 
Both The Guardian newspaper (UK) and the American non-profit publication ICIJ received documents in July 2014 revealing the details of past and present offshore clients of wealth managers Kleinwort Benson, including the Nando's restaurant group. The Guardian published its belief that, through the use of businesses in Malta, Guernsey and the Netherlands, Enthoven legally reduces the group's UK corporation tax bill by "up to a third." According to the British newspaper, Enthoven's profits eventually accumulate in the Kleinwort Benson-managed "Taro III Trust" that is based in Jersey and contains at least £750 million.

While no member of the Enthoven family agreed to speak with The Guardian, a company representative explained that UK tax laws are not applicable to Enthoven, as "he is not resident in the US or the UK." The spokesperson also stated that, in the UK, Nando's paid corporation tax of £12.6 million on a profit of £58.2 million for the year ending February 2013.

See also
 Chicken restaurant
 List of fast-food chicken restaurants
 Oporto – Australian-based Portuguese themed chicken restaurant
 TASTE Holdings – management group in which Chickenland (Pty) Ltd has significant shareholding

References

External links

  – (global)

Fast-food chains of South Africa
Restaurant franchises
Companies based in Johannesburg
Fast casual restaurants
Restaurants established in 1987
Poultry restaurants
Multinational food companies
Multinational companies headquartered in South Africa
1987 establishments in South Africa
South African brands